Brownswood is a ward in the London Borough of Hackney and forms part of the Hackney North and Stoke Newington constituency. The ward has existed since the creation of the borough on 1 April 1965 and was first used in the 1964 elections. The population of the ward in 2011 was 11,091. The boundaries of the ward from May 2014 are revised.

1965–1978
Brownswood ward has existed since the creation of the London Borough of Hackney on 1 April 1965. It was first used in the 1964 election to Hackney London Borough Council, with an electorate of 5,629, returning two councillors. On 7 May 1964 election there was a turnout of 20.1% and both councillors elected were Labour Party members. The councillors did not formally take up office until 1 April 1965, for a three-year term.

At 9 May 1968 election there was a turnout of 25.9% and both councillors elected were Conservative Party members. The councillors served for a three-year term. For 13 May 1971 election there was a turnout of 30.6% and two Labour Party members were elected. The councillors served for a three-year term.

The election on 2 May 1974 had a turnout of 26.6% and returned two Labour Party members. The term length was changed by the Local Government Act 1972 and the councillors were elected for a four-year term at this and all subsequent elections.

1978–2002
There was a revision of ward boundaries in Hackney in 1978. The ward had an electorate of 5,592 and returned two councillors.

The ward elected two Labour Party members at the election on 4 May 1978 with a turnout of 34.5%.

For the election on 6 May 1982 the ward elected two Labour Party members, with a turnout of 34%

At the election on 8 May 1986 two Labour Party members were returned with a turnout of 40%.

In 2001 Brownswood ward had a total population of 11,315. This compared with the average ward population within the borough at the time of 10,674.

2002–2014
There was a revision of ward boundaries in Hackney in 2002. The ward returns three councillors to the Hackney London Borough Council holding an election every four years. At the previous election on 6 May 2010 Brian Bell, Feryat Demirci, and Oli de Botton; all Labour Party candidates, were returned. The turnout was 60%, with 4,637 votes cast.

From 2014
The ward was reduced in size for the May 2014 election with the eastern section becoming part of the new ward of Woodberry Down. The number of councillors elected for the revised Brownswood ward was reduced from three to two, returning Labour Party candidates Clare Potter and Brian Bell.

References

External links
 Council Elections 2006 results – Brownswood
 London Borough of Hackney list of constituencies and councillors.
 Labour Party profile of Brownswood ward.
 Ward map

Wards of the London Borough of Hackney
1965 establishments in England